The Angriest Man in Brooklyn is a 2014 American comedy-drama film directed by Phil Alden Robinson and starring Robin Williams, Mila Kunis, Peter Dinklage, James Earl Jones, and Melissa Leo. It is a remake of the 1997 Israeli film The 92 Minutes of Mr. Baum, written and directed by Assi Dayan. The film follows an angry, bitter man whose doctor tells him he has a brain aneurysm and has only 90 minutes to live. As the patient races around the city, trying to right his wrongs, the doctor attempts to find him and take him to a hospital.  
The film was released in a limited release and through video on demand  on May 23, 2014, by Lionsgate. This is the final film starring Williams to be released during his lifetime.

Plot
Stuck in Brooklyn traffic while on his way to a doctor's appointment, Henry Altmann's car is suddenly struck by a taxi. Propelling him into a rage, he unleashes upon the taxi driver.

Arriving to the Brooklyn hospital, Dr. Sharon Gill is covering for Henry's usual doctor (with whom she is having an affair). Examining scans of his brain, she informs him that he has a brain aneurysm with a poor prognosis. He erupts, throwing insults at Sharon and demanding that she tell him how long he has to live. She tries to dodge the question, but Henry is persistent. Panicking, Sharon sees a magazine cover that says 90 minutes and blurts that out. Henry leaves, irate.

Talking with another doctor, Sharon realizes the consequences of her actions; she will surely be fired and lose her license. She resolves to find Henry and put him into immediate care.

Henry arrives at his family law firm, storming into a meeting between his brother Aaron and clients. He asks what a hypothetical client with only ninety minutes to live should do, one says make love to his wife one last time. Henry then rushes home to his estranged wife, Bette, only to catch her having an affair with their neighbor. Meanwhile, Sharon learns Henry's case is serious enough that he could potentially die at any minute.

Sharon arrives at Henry's office, where she tells Aaron of his brother's diagnosis. He tells her that Henry was once a kind, happy man, but became embittered after the death of his son, Peter, two years prior. Meanwhile, Henry makes more stops on his quest for redemption, including attempting to contact his surviving son, Tommy. He had disapproved of his son's choice to become a professional dancer, creating a rift. He makes a recording, telling Tommy he loves him, but flies into a rage halfway through and passes out.

When Henry regains consciousness, he goes to the Brooklyn Bridge, intent on jumping off. Sharon finds him there, apologizes for her earlier behavior, admitting she has no idea when he might die. She begs him not to jump, saying that her career—and by extension her life—will be over if he does.

Henry still leaps off the bridge, however, and Sharon rushes to the river, dragging him to shore. He realizes it's his second chance and asks her to help him make things right with his family. Checking her watch, he sees he has only nineteen minutes left. Sharon hails a cab, driven by the same cabbie who hit Henry that morning. The men begin to fight, but she momentarily blinds the driver with pepper spray and they take off in his cab.

Driving to the Brooklyn Dancing Academy, Henry finds Tommy sitting alone. They begin to dance, just like when Tommy was a little boy. After sharing this moment with his son, Henry informs Sharon that he does not want to know when he will die; he only wants to know that he will try and lead a better life and that they can both find happiness. He then collapses on her shoulder, exhausted. Henry goes to the hospital and lives for another eight days, giving him time to share special moments with his family.

One year later after Henry's death, Bette, Tommy, Aaron, and Sharon are together on a ferry, celebrating his life on a ferry, spreading his ashes on the East River. The captain of the cruise ship tells them it's illegal, but they berate him in Henry's honor.

Cast

Reception
On review aggregation website Rotten Tomatoes the film holds an approval rating of 9% based on 32 reviews, with an average rating of 3.43/10. On Metacritic the film has a weighted average score of 21 out of 100, based on 13 critics, indicating "generally unfavorable reviews".

Peter Debruge of Variety called the film "A schmaltz opera that indulges Robin Williams' most melancholy tics and themes." 
William Bibbiani at Craveonline found positives in the film stating: "There’s a manic energy to this premise, the dogged efforts of a particularly screwed individual stymied at every turn, that evokes warm, funny memories of similar screwball stories."

Release
In November 2013, Lionsgate acquired distribution rights to the film. It was released in a limited release and through video on demand on May 23, 2014.

Home media
The film was released on DVD and Blu-ray Disc on July 22, 2014.

References

External links
 

2014 films
American comedy-drama films
Films directed by Phil Alden Robinson
Films set in Brooklyn
2014 comedy-drama films
American remakes of Israeli films
Lionsgate films
Films about Jews and Judaism
Films shot in New York City
2010s English-language films
2010s American films